|}

The Ascendant Stakes is a Listed flat horse race in Great Britain open to two-year-old horses. It is run at Haydock Park over a distance of 1 mile and 37 yards (1,643 metres).
The race was first run in 2007, and it is scheduled to take place each year in September. The race is run on the same day as Haydock's feature race of the season, the Group One Haydock Sprint Cup.

Records
Leading jockey (2 wins):
 Richard Hughes – Havana Gold (2012), Chief Barker (2013)

Leading trainer (3 wins):
 Richard Hannon Sr. – Emerald Commander (2009), Havana Gold (2012), Chief Barker (2013)

Winners

See also
 Horse racing in Great Britain
 List of British flat horse races

References
 Racing Post:

Flat races in Great Britain
Haydock Park Racecourse
Flat horse races for two-year-olds
Recurring sporting events established in 2007
2007 establishments in England